Kavadikalam is a town in Malappuram district, Kerala, India.

Location
The town is located east of the Kottakkal municipality. It is 2 kilometers away from Kottakkal town.

Education
 ALPS Kavathikalam (School)
 Najmul Huda Higher Secondary School

Religion
The major religions in the localities are Islam and Hinduism. Kavathikalam Juma Masjid is the main devotional institute for Muslims and Kavathikalam Siva Temple is the main devotional center for Hindus.

References

Cities and towns in Malappuram district
Kottakkal area